is a large temple settlement in Wakayama Prefecture, Japan to the south of Osaka. In the strictest sense, Mount Kōya is the mountain name (sangō) of Kongōbu-ji Temple, the ecclesiastical headquarters of the Kōyasan sect of Shingon Buddhism.

First settled in 819 by the monk Kūkai, Mount Kōya is primarily known as the world headquarters of the Kōyasan Shingon sect of Japanese Buddhism.  Located on an 800-meter-high plain amid eight peaks of the mountain (which was the reason this location was selected, in that the terrain is supposed to resemble a lotus plant), the original monastery has grown into the town of Kōya, featuring a university dedicated to religious studies and 120 sub-temples, many of which offer lodging to pilgrims.  Mount Kōya is also a common starting point to the  associated with Kūkai.

The mountain is home to the following famous sites:
 , the head temple of the Kōyasan Shingon Buddhism. Located roughly in the middle of the sanctuary, Kongobuji is colloquially known as "Kōyasan-Issan", literally meaning "the mountain of Kōya". The temple was built by the warlord Toyotomi Hideyoshi for the benefit of his mother when she died. Originally named Seigan-ji, it was later renamed Kongōbu-ji in the Meiji Era.
 , at the heartland of the Mount Kōya settlement. Garan is a name for an area that has the main sacred buildings: a main hall, several pagodas, a scripture storage, a bell tower, a lecture hall, and other halls dedicated to important deities. There is also a shrine dedicated to the Shintō gods of that mountain area and in front of it an assembly hall (Sannō-dō). Danjō Garan is one of the two sacred spots around Mount Kōya. 
 , the "Basic Great Pagoda" that according to Shingon Buddhist doctrine represents the central point of a mandala covering all of Japan. Standing at 48.5 meters tall and situated right in the middle of Kōyasan, this pagoda was built as a seminary for the esoteric practices of Shingon Buddhism. This pagoda and the Okunoin Temple form a large sanctuary.
 , an assembly hall for special ceremonies dedicated to the Shintō gods guarding the area
 , the mausoleum of Kūkai, surrounded by an immense graveyard (the largest in Japan)
 , the traditional route up the mountain with stone markers (ishi) every 109 meters (chō)
 , the main gate for Mount Kōya. This mammoth gate stands as the main entrance to Kōyasan. It is flanked on each side by Kongo warriors who guard the mountain.
Tokugawa Family Tomb. This mausoleum was built by the third shōgun Iemitsu Tokugawa. It took ten years to build and is architecturally representative of the Edo Period. First Edo shōgun Ieyasu is enshrined on the right and the second shōgun Hidetada on the left. The structure is decorated with carvings and brass fittings.
 It also houses a replica of the Nestorian stele.

In 2004, UNESCO designated Kongōbu-ji on Mount Kōya, as part of the World Heritage Site "Sacred Sites and Pilgrimage Routes in the Kii Mountain Range". Kōya Sankeimichi, the traditional pilgrimage route to Mount Kōya was also inscribed as part of the World Heritage Site. 

The complex includes a memorial hall and cemetery honoring Japanese who were imprisoned or executed for committing atrocities during World War II.

Access 
Kōya-san is accessible primarily by the Nankai Electric Railway from Namba Station (in Osaka) to Gokurakubashi Station at the base of the mountain. A cable car from Gokurakubashi ("Paradise Bridge") then whisks visitors to the top in 5 minutes. The entire trip takes about 1.5 hours on an express train or 2 hours by non-express.

Local automobile traffic can be very heavy on weekends until well into the evening. On weekdays, however, the mountain offers a pleasant drive followed by the excitement of reaching the monasteries lining the summit.  Many Buddhist monasteries on the mountain function as hotels for visitors providing traditional accommodation with an evening meal and breakfast. Guest are also invited to participate in the morning services.

Buses 
There is a bus which runs non-stop from Kansai Airport to Mount Kōya, and it costs 2,000 yen (adult). The bus is operated by Kansai Airport Transportion and Willer Express.
The Koyasan Marine Liner bus runs from Wakayamakō Station to Okunoin Bus stop on Mount Kōya, and it costs 2250 yen (adult). The bus is operated by Daijū Bus - 大十バス.

Climate

Gallery

See also 
Koyasan Reihōkan
Mount Ōmine
Sacred mountains
Tourism in Japan

Notes

Further reading

External links 

Sacred Sites and Pilgrimage Routes in the Kii Mountain Range (UNESCO)
KONGOBUJI（金剛峰寺）　
Mount Koya-san JAPAN: the Official Guide
Koyasan Tourist Association
Photo set of the Okunoin cemetery of Koyasan (photos under Creative Commons license)

Koya
Buddhist temples in Wakayama Prefecture
Shingon Buddhism
World Heritage Sites in Japan
Sacred mountains of Japan
Kūkai
Koya